Saúl Fernández Lara (18 March 1982 – 15 July 2014) was a Spanish footballer who played in different clubs in the Segunda División B and the Tercera División. He played as defender.

He died from colon cancer on 15 July 2014, aged 32.

References

External links

1982 births
2014 deaths
Footballers from Asturias
Spanish footballers
Association football defenders
Segunda División B players
Tercera División players
Caudal Deportivo footballers
Sporting de Gijón B players
Marino de Luanco footballers
CD Lealtad players
UP Langreo footballers
Deaths from colorectal cancer
Deaths from cancer in Spain
People from San Martín del Rey Aurelio